Countervailing duties (CVDs), also known as anti-subsidy duties, are trade import duties imposed under World Trade Organization (WTO) rules to neutralize the negative effects of subsidies. They are imposed after an investigation finds that a foreign country subsidizes its exports, injuring domestic producers in the importing country. According to World Trade Organization rules, a country can launch its own investigation and decide to charge extra duties, provided such additional duties are in accordance with the GATT Article VI and the GATT Agreement on Subsidies and Countervailing Measures. 

Since countries can rule domestically whether domestic industries are in danger and whether foreign countries subsidize the products, the institutional process surrounding the investigation and determinations has significant impacts beyond the countervailing duties.

Countervailing duties in the U.S. are assessed by the International Trade Administration of the U.S. Department of Commerce which determines whether imports in question are being subsidized and, if so, by how much. If there is a determination that there is material injury to the competing domestic industry, the Department of Commerce will instruct U.S. Customs and Border Protection to levy duties in the amount equivalent to subsidy margins.  

Petitions for remedies may be filed by domestic manufacturers or unions within the domestic industry, but the law requires that the petitioners represent at least 25% of the domestic production of the goods for which competition is causing material injury.  

 
 
 
 

Import
Customs duties